Nikos Chouchoumis (alternate spellings: Nikolaos, Houhoumis) ((born May 1, 1996) is a Greek professional basketball player for Charilaos Trikoupis of the Greek A2 Basket League. He is a 1.86 m. tall combo guard.

Professional career
Chouchoumis made his professional debut with Panelefsiniakos against Panathinaikos where his team lost 74-35. In 2014 he signed with Aries Trikala In 2016 he signed with B League Cretan club Ergotelis On November 12, after failing to find a contract in the NBA G League, Chouchoumis joined Kavala.

References

External links
myplayer.gr profile
Greek League profile 
Eurobasket.com profile
RealGM.COM profile

1996 births
Living people
Aries Trikala B.C. players
Charilaos Trikoupis B.C. players
Ergotelis B.C. players
Greek men's basketball players
Greek Basket League players
Panelefsiniakos B.C. players
Point guards
Shooting guards
Maniots